Alexander Yevgenyevich Gavrilov (born 5 December 1943) is a Russian pair skater who competed internationally for the Soviet Union. With partner Tatiana Zhuk, he is the World bronze medalist and the 1963 & 1964 European bronze medalist. They placed 5th at the 1964 Winter Olympics. He also competed one season with Tamara Moskvina, winning the 1965 Soviet Championships.

Results

With Zhuk

With Moskvina

References

 
 Pairs on Ice: Zhuk & Gavrilov

1943 births
Living people
Russian male pair skaters
Soviet male pair skaters
Figure skaters at the 1964 Winter Olympics
Olympic figure skaters of the Soviet Union
Sportspeople from Novosibirsk
World Figure Skating Championships medalists
European Figure Skating Championships medalists